Sergeantsville is a historic unincorporated community located within Delaware Township, in Hunterdon County, New Jersey, United States.

Sergeantsville was first settled by a Mr. Thatcher in 1700, and was later named for Charles Sergeant, an American Revolutionary War soldier, in honor of the Sergeant family of which three brothers were local shopkeepers. "Out-of-towners give themselves away when they pronounce the first syllable 'sarge'; it's 'serge.'" Green Sergeant's Covered Bridge, constructed in 1872 across the Wickecheoke Creek, is located just west of Sergeantsville and is the oldest remaining covered bridge in New Jersey.

Sergeantsville was officially created in 1827 when it became desirable to establish a post office.  Until that time, this largely rural area was known as "Skunktown", perhaps because the town served as a market center for skunk pelts.

Sergeantsville's annual "Thanksgiving in the Country" house tour, established in 1973, takes four or five different homes each year, that have historical, architectural or cultural qualities.

Notable people

People who were born in, residents of, or otherwise closely associated with Sergeantsville include:
 William Cotton (1880–1958), portrait painter, caricaturist, and playwright.

References

External links

Thanksgiving in the Country - an annual tour of Sergeantsville's historic homes
Sergeantsville Volunteer Fire Company

1827 establishments in New Jersey
Delaware Township, Hunterdon County, New Jersey
Populated places established in 1827
Unincorporated communities in Hunterdon County, New Jersey
Unincorporated communities in New Jersey
National Register of Historic Places in Hunterdon County, New Jersey
Historic districts on the National Register of Historic Places in New Jersey